The 2017 Record Bank E3 Harelbeke was a road cycling one-day race that took place on 24 March. It was the 60th edition of the E3 Harelbeke and was the eleventh event of the 2017 UCI World Tour.

In a three-up sprint finish of Belgian riders, Greg Van Avermaet took the race victory ahead of national champion Philippe Gilbert from the  team, while the podium placings were completed by 's Oliver Naesen.

Teams
As E3 Harelbeke was a UCI World Tour event, all eighteen UCI WorldTeams were invited automatically and obliged to enter a team in the race. Seven UCI Professional Continental teams competed, completing the 25-team peloton.

Route
The -long E3 Harelbeke commenced in the centre of Harelbeke and moved east to its most eastern point at Ninove after  before turning west and traveling through the Flemish Ardennes with fifteen climbs.

Categorised climbs and cobbles

Result

References

External links

2017 UCI World Tour
2017 in Belgian sport
2017
March 2017 sports events in Europe